Johor Bahru, colloquially referred to as JB, is the capital city of the state of Johor, Malaysia. It is located at the southern end of Peninsular Malaysia, along the north bank of the Straits of Johor, opposite the city-state Singapore. The city has a population of 858,118 people within an area of 391.25 km2. Johor Bahru is adjacent to the city of Iskandar Puteri and Pasir Gudang, together with their surrounding areas anchoring Malaysia's second largest urban agglomeration, Iskandar Malaysia, with a population of 2,246,712.

Johor Bahru was founded in 1855 as Tanjung Puteri when the Sultanate of Johor came under the influence of Temenggong Daeng Ibrahim. The area was renamed "Johore Bahru" in 1862 and became the capital of the Sultanate when the Sultanate administration centre was moved there from Telok Blangah, which is today located within southern Singapore.

Johor Bahru serves as one of the two land border connections on the Malaysian side between the countries of Singapore and Malaysia, the other being the Second Link that links Iskandar Puteri to Tuas. It is the busiest international border crossing in the world; its direct land link to Woodlands, Singapore through the causeway is a key economic driver of the border city. Johor Bahru is categorised as Zone A of Iskandar Malaysia and is adjacent to Senai International Airport and the 15th busiest port in the world, Port of Tanjung Pelepas.

During the reign of Sultan Abu Bakar, there was further development and modernisation within the city; with the construction of administrative buildings, schools, religious buildings, and railways connecting to Woodlands in Singapore. Along with most of Southeast Asia, Japanese forces occupied Johor Bahru from 1942 to 1945 during the Pacific War. Johor Bahru became the cradle of Malay nationalism after the war and a major political party known as the United Malays National Organisation (UMNO) was founded at the Istana Besar of Johor Bahru in 1946. After the formation of Malaysia in 1963, Johor Bahru retained its status as state capital and was granted city status in 1994. Today, it is one of the most developed cities in the nation and currently serves as the financial centre and logistics hub of southern Malaysia.

Etymology
The present area of Johor Bahru was originally known as Tanjung Puteri, and was a fishing village of the Malays. Temenggong Daeng Ibrahim then renamed Tanjung Puteri to Iskandar Puteri once he arrived in the area in 1858 after acquiring the territory from Sultan Ali; before it was renamed Johor Bahru by Sultan Abu Bakar following the Temenggong's death. (The suffix "Bah(a)ru" means "new" in Malay, normally written "baru" in standard spelling today but appearing with several variants in place names, such as Kota Bharu and Indonesian Pekanbaru.) The British preferred to spell its name as Johore Bahru or Johore Bharu, but the current accepted western spelling is Johor Bahru, as Johore is only spelt Johor (without the letter "e" at the end of the word) in the Malay language. The city is also spelt as Johor Baru or Johor Baharu.

The city was also once known as "Little Swatow (Shantou)" by the Chinese community in Johor Bahru, as most of Johor Bahru's Chinese residents are Teochew people whose ancestry can be traced back to Shantou, China. They arrived in the mid 19th century, during the reign of Temenggong Daeng Ibrahim. The city, however, is generally known in Chinese as Xinshan meaning "New Mountain" as "mountain" may be used to mean "territory" or "land", and the name "New Mountain" distinguished it from the "Old Mountain" (Jiushan) once used to refer to Kranji and Sembawang in Singapore on the opposite side of the Straits of Johor, where Chinese first cultivated pepper and gambier in plantations before the Chinese moved to new land in Johor Bahru to create new plantations in 1855.

History

Due to a dispute between the Malays and the Bugis, the Johor-Riau Sultanate was split in 1819 with the mainland portion of the Johor Sultanate coming under the control of Temenggong Daeng Ibrahim while the Riau-Lingga Sultanate came under the control of the Bugis. The Temenggong intended to create a new administration centre for the Johor Sultanate to create a dynasty under the entity of Temenggong. As the Temenggong already had a close relationship with the British and the British intended to have control over trade activities in Singapore, a treaty was signed between Sultan Ali and Temenggong Ibrahim in Singapore on 10 March 1855. According to the treaty, Ali would be crowned as the Sultan of Johor and receive $5,000 (in Spanish dollars) with an allowance of $500 per month. In return, Ali was required to cede the sovereignty of the territory of Johor (except Kesang of Muar which would be the only territory under his control) to Temenggong Ibrahim. When both sides agreed on Temenggong acquiring the territory, he renamed it Iskandar Puteri and began to administer it from Telok Blangah in Singapore.

As the area was still an undeveloped jungle, Temenggong encouraged the migration of Chinese and Javanese to clear the land and to develop an agricultural economy in Johor. The Chinese planted the area with black pepper and gambier, while the Javanese dug parit (canals) to drain water from the land, build roads and plant coconuts. During this time, a Chinese businessman, pepper and gambier cultivator, Wong Ah Fook arrived; at the same time, the Kangchu and Javanese labour contract systems were introduced by the Chinese and Javanese communities. After Temenggong's death on 31 January 1862, the town was renamed "Johor Bahru" and his position was succeeded by his son, Abu Bakar, with the administration centre in Telok Blangah being moved to the area in 1889.

British administration

In the first phase of Abu Bakar's administration, the British only recognised him as a maharaja rather than a sultan. In 1855, the British Colonial Office began to recognise his status as a Sultan after he met Queen Victoria. He managed to regain Kesang territory for Johor after a civil war with the aid of British forces and he boosted the town's infrastructure and agricultural economy. Infrastructure such as the State Mosque and Royal Palace was built with the aid of Wong Ah Fook, who had become a close patron for the Sultan since his migration during the Temenggong reign. As the Johor-British relationship improved, Abu Bakar also set up his administration under a British style and implemented a constitution known as Undang-undang Tubuh Negeri Johor (Johor State Constitution). Although the British had long been advisers for the Sultanate of Johor, the Sultanate never came under direct colonial rule of the British. The direct colonial rule only came into effect when the status of the adviser was elevated to a status similar to that of a Resident in the Federated Malay States (FMS) during the reign of Sultan Ibrahim in 1914.

In Johor Bahru, the Malay Peninsula railway extension was finished in 1909, and in 1923 the Johor–Singapore Causeway was completed. Johor Bahru developed at a modest rate between the First and Second World Wars. The secretariat building—Sultan Ibrahim Building—was completed in 1940 as the British colonial government attempted to streamline the state's administration.

World War II

The continuous development of Johor Bahru was, however, halted when the Japanese under General Tomoyuki Yamashita invaded the town on 31 January 1942. As the Japanese had reached northwest Johor by 15 January, they easily captured major towns of Johor such of Batu Pahat, Yong Peng, Kluang and Ayer Hitam. The British and other Allied forces were forced to retreat towards Johor Bahru; however, following a further series of bombings by the Japanese on 29 January, the British retreated to Singapore and blew up the causeway the following day as a final attempt to stop the Japanese advance in British Malaya. The Japanese then used the Sultan's residence of Bukit Serene Palace located in the town as their main temporary base for their future initial plans to conquer Singapore while waiting to reconnect the causeway. The Japanese chose the palace as their main base because they already knew the British would not dare to attack it as this would harm their close relationship with Johor.

In less than a month, the Japanese repaired the causeway and invaded the Singapore island easily. Soon after the war ended in 1946, the town became the main hotspot for Malay nationalism in Malaya. Onn Jaafar, a local Malay politician who later became the Chief Minister of Johor, formed the United Malay National Organisation party on 11 May 1946 when the Malays expressed their widespread disenchantment over the British government's action for granting citizenship laws to non-Malays in the proposed states of the Malayan Union. An agreement over the policy was then reached in the town with Malays agreeing with the dominance of economy by the non-Malays and the Malays' dominance in political matters being agreed upon by non-Malays. Racial conflict between the Malay and non-Malays, especially the Chinese, is being provoked continuously since the Malayan Emergency.

Post-independence
After the formation of the Federation of Malaysia in 1963, Johor Bahru continued as the state capital and more development was carried out, with the town's expansion and the construction of more new townships and industrial estates. The Indonesian confrontation did not directly affect Johor Bahru as the main Indonesian landing point in Johor was in Labis and Tenang in Segamat District as well Pontian District. There is only one active Indonesian spy organisation in the town, known as Gerakan Ekonomi Melayu Indonesia (GEMI). They frequently engaged with the Indonesian communities living there to contribute information for Indonesian commandos until the bombing of the MacDonald House in Singapore in 1965. By the early 1990s, the town had considerably expanded in size, and was officially granted a city status on 1 January 1994. Johor Bahru City Council was formed and the city's current main square, Dataran Bandaraya Johor Bahru, was constructed to commemorate the event. A central business district was developed in the centre of the city from the mid-1990s in the area around Wong Ah Fook Street. The state and federal government channelled considerable funds for the development of the city—particularly more so after 2006, when the Iskandar Malaysia was formed. However, more than ten years of unbridled building construction in Iskandar, especially of higher-end high-rise apartments and commercial property, has led to a serious glut of such property in the region. Occupancy of high-rise accommodation has been predicted to fall to 50 percent, and commercial property to 65 percent, by the end of 2019 due to continued incoming supply.

Governance

As the capital city of Johor, the city plays an important role in the economic welfare of the entire state's population. There is one member of parliament (MP) representing the single parliamentary constituency (P.160) in the city. The city also elects two representatives to the state legislature from the state assembly districts of Larkin and Stulang.

Local authority and city definition
The city is administered by the Johor Bahru City Council. The current mayor is  Dato' Haji Mohd Noorazam bin Dato' Haji Osman, which took office since 15 August 2021. Johor Bahru obtained city status on 1 January 1994. The area under the jurisdiction of the Johor Bahru City Council includes Central District, Kangkar Tebrau, Kempas, Larkin, Majidee, Maju Jaya, Mount Austin, Pandan, Pasir Pelangi, Pelangi, Permas Jaya, Rinting, Tampoi, Tasek Utara and Tebrau. Currently there are 11 council members in the city council, which consists of 3 Amanah members, 3 Bersatu members, 3 DAP members and 2 PKR members. In August 2021, mayor Adib Azhari Daud was arrested and taken into custody for allegedly accepting bribes from contractors while overseeing development of Johor Bahru. The arrest marks the first time an active Johor mayor has been arrested.

Courts of law and legal enforcement

The city high court complex is located along Dato' Onn Road. The Sessions and Magistrate Courts is located on Ayer Molek Road, while another court for Sharia law is located on Abu Bakar Road. The Johor (state) Police Contingent Headquarters is located on Tebrau Road. Johor Bahru's Southern District police headquarters, which also operates as a police station, is on Meldrum Road in the city centre. The Johor Bahru Southern District traffic police headquarters is a separate entity along Tebrau Road, close to the city centre. Johor Bahru's Northern District police headquarters and Northern District Traffic Police headquarters are co-located in Skudai, about 20 km north of the city centre. There are around eleven police stations and seven police substations (Pondok Polis) in the greater Johor Bahru area. Johor Bahru Prison was located in the city along Ayer Molek Road, but was closed down after 122 years operation in December 2005, its function being transferred to an expanded prison in the town of Kluang about 110 km from Johor Bahru. Other temporary lock-ups or prison cells are available in most police stations in the city, as in other parts of Malaysia.

Geography

Johor Bahru is located along the Straits of Johor at the southern end of Peninsular Malaysia.

Climate

The city has an equatorial climate with consistent temperatures, a considerable amount of rain, and high humidity throughout the course of the year. An equatorial climate is a tropical rainforest climate more subject to the Intertropical Convergence Zone than the trade winds and with no cyclone. The wettest months, with 19 to 25 percent more rain than average, are April, November and December. Although the climate is relatively uniform, it does show some seasonal variation due to the effects of monsoons, with noticeable changes in wind speed and direction, cloud cover and amount of rainfall. There are two monsoon periods each year, the first one between mid-October and January, which is the north-east Monsoon. This period is characterised by heavier rainfall and wind from the north-east. The second one is the south-west Monsoon, which hardly affects the rainfall in Johor Bahru, where winds are from the south and south-west. This occurs between June and September.

Demographics

Johor Bahru has an official demonym where people are commonly referred to as "Johor Bahruans". The terms "J.B-ites" and "J.B-ians" have also been used to a limited extent. People from Johor are called Johoreans.

Ethnicity and religion
The Malaysian Census in 2010 reported the population of Johor Bahru as 497,067. The city's population today is a mixture of three main ethnicities - Malays, Chinese and Indians- along with other bumiputras. Malays comprise a plurality of the population at 240,323, followed by Chinese totalling 172,609, Indians totaling 73,319 and others totalling 2,957. Non-Malaysian citizens form a population of 2,585. The Malays in Johor Bahru are strongly related to the neighbouring Riau Malays. The Chinese mainly are from the majority Teochew, Hokkien, Hainanese, and Hakka dialect groups, while the Indian community mainly and predominantly are Tamils, there are also small populations of Telugus, Malayalis and Sikh Punjabis. The Malays are majority Muslims, while the Chinese are predominantly Buddhists and the Indian were mostly Hindus despite there is also a small numbers from the two ethnic groups that are Christians and Muslims. A small number of Sikhs, Taoists, Animists, and secularists can also be found in the city.

The following is based on Department of Statistics Malaysia 2010 census.

Languages
The local ethnic Malays speak the Malay language, while the language primarily spoken by the local Chinese is Mandarin Chinese. The Chinese community is represented by several dialect groups: Teochew, Hainanese, Hakka and Hokkien.

The Indian community predominantly speaks Tamil (also lingua franca among all Indians), with a minority of Malayalam, Telugu and Punjabi speakers. The English language (or Manglish) is also used considerably, albeit more so among the older generation, who have attended school during the British rule.

Economy

Johor Bahru is one of the fastest-growing cities in Malaysia after Kuala Lumpur. It is the main commercial centre for Johor and is located in the Indonesia–Malaysia–Singapore Growth Triangle. Tertiary-based industry dominates the economy with many international tourists from the regions visiting the city. It is the centre of financial services, commerce and retail, arts and culture, hospitality, urban tourism, plastic manufacturing, electrical and electronics and food processing. The main shopping districts are located within the city, with a number of large shopping malls located in the suburbs. Johor Bahru is the location of numerous conferences, congress and trade fairs, such as the Eastern Regional Organisation for Planning and Housing and the World Islamic Economic Forum. The city is the first in Malaysia to practise a low-carbon economy.

The city has a very close economic relationship with Singapore. There are around 3,000 logistic lorries crossing between Johor Bahru and Singapore every day for delivering goods between the two sides for trading activities. Many residents in Singapore frequently visit the city during the weekends; some of them have also chosen to live in the city. Many of the city's residents work in Singapore.

Transportation

Land

The internal roads linking different parts of the city are mostly federal roads constructed and maintained by Malaysian Public Works Department. There are five major highways linking the Johor Bahru Central Business District to outlying suburbs: Tebrau Highway and Johor Bahru Eastern Dispersal Link Expressway in the northeast, Skudai Highway in the northwest, Iskandar Coastal Highway in the west and Johor Bahru East Coast Highway in the east. Pasir Gudang Highway and the connecting Johor Bahru Parkway cross Tebrau Highway and Skudai Highway, which serve as the middle ring road of the metropolitan area. The Johor Bahru Inner Ring Road, which connects with the Sultan Iskandar customs complex, aids in controlling the traffic in and around the central business district. Access to the national expressway is provided through the North–South Expressway and Senai–Desaru Expressway. The Johor–Singapore Causeway links the city to Woodlands, Singapore with a six-lane road and a railway line terminating at the Southern Integrated Gateway.

Bus
The main bus terminal of the city is the Larkin Sentral located in Larkin. Other bus terminals include Taman Johor Jaya Bus Terminal and Ulu Tiram Bus Terminal. Larkin Sentral has direct bus services to and from many destinations in West Malaysia, southern Thailand and Singapore, while Taman Johor Jaya and Ulu Tiram Bus Terminals serve local destinations. Major bus operators in the city are Causeway Link, Maju and S&S. It is possible to get around the city by bus, though the frequency of the bus might be an issue.

Taxi
Two types of taxis operate in the city; the main taxi is either in red and yellow, blue, green or red while the larger, less common type is known as a limousine taxi, which is more comfortable but expensive. Most taxis in the city do not use their meter.

Railway
The city is served by two railway stations, which are Johor Bahru Sentral railway station and Kempas Baru railway station. Both stations serve train services to Kuala Lumpur and Singapore. In 2015, a new shuttle train service operated by Keretapi Tanah Melayu (KTM) was launched providing transport to Woodlands in Singapore.

Air
The city is served by Senai International Airport located at the neighbouring Senai town and connected through Skudai Highway. Four airlines, AirAsia (and its subsidiaries Indonesia AirAsia and Thai AirAsia), Firefly, Malaysia Airlines, Batik Air Malaysia and formerly Xpress Air, provide flights domestically as well as international flights to Jakarta Soekarno–Hatta, Surabaya, Hồ Chí Minh City, and Bangkok Don Mueang.

Sea
Boat services are available to ports in Batam and Bintan Islands in Indonesia from Stulang Laut Ferry Terminal, located near the suburb of Stulang.

Other utilities

Healthcare

There are three public hospitals, four health clinics and thirteen 1Malaysia clinics in Johor Bahru. Sultanah Aminah Hospital, which is located along Persiaran Road, is the largest public hospital in Johor Bahru as well as in Johor with 989 beds. Another government funded hospital is the Sultan Ismail Specialist Hospital with 700 beds. Another large private health facility is the KPJ Puteri Specialist Hospital with 158 beds. Further healthcare facilities are currently being expanded to improve healthcare services in the city.

Education

Many government or state schools are available in the city. The secondary schools include English College Johore Bahru, Sekolah Menengah Kebangsaan Engku Aminah, Sekolah Menengah Kebangsaan Sultan Ismail, Sekolah Menengah Infant Jesus Convent, Sekolah Menengah Kebangsaan (Perempuan) Sultan Ibrahim and Sekolah Menengah Saint Joseph. There are also a number of independent private schools in the city. These include Austin Heights, Excelsior International School, Foon Yew High School and the Sri Ara Schools. The other private universities are Raffles University Iskandar and Wawasan Open University. There are also a number of private college campuses and one polytechnic operating in the city; these are Crescendo International College, KPJ College, Olympia College, Sunway College Johor Bahru, Taylor's College and College of Islamic Studies Johor.

Libraries

The Johor Public Library headquarters is the main library in the state, located off Yahya Awal Road. Another public library branch is the University Park in Kebudayaan Road, while there are other libraries or private libraries in schools, colleges, and universities. Two village libraries are available in the district of Johor Bahru.

Culture and leisure

Attractions and recreation spots

Cultural attractions

There are a number of cultural attractions in Johor Bahru. The Royal Abu Bakar Museum located within the Grand Palace building is the main museum in the city. The Johor Bahru Kwong Siew Heritage located in Wong Ah Fook Street housed the former Cantonese clan house that was donated by Wong Ah Fook. The Foon Yew High School houses many historical documents of the city history with a Chinese cultural heritage. The Johor Bahru Chinese Heritage Museum on Ibrahim Road includes the history of Chinese migration to Johor along with a collection of documents, photos, and other artefacts.

The Johor Art Gallery in Petrie Road is a house gallery built in 1910, known as the house for the former third Chief Minister of Johor, Abdullah Jaafar. The house features old architecture and became the centre for the collection of artefacts related to Johor's cultural history since its renovation in 2000.

Historical attractions

The Grand Palace is one of the historical attractions in the city, and is an example of Victorian-style architecture with a garden. Figure Museum is another historical colonial building since 1886 which ever become the house for the Johor first Menteri Besar Jaafar Muhammad; it is located on the top of Smile Hill (Bukit Senyum). The English College (now Maktab Sultan Abu Bakar) established in 1914 was located close to the Sungai Chat Palace before being moved to its present location at Sungai Chat Road; some of the ruins are visible at the old site. The Sultan Ibrahim Building is another historical building in the city; built in 1936 by British architect Palmer and Turner, it was the centre of the administration of Johor as since the relocation from Telok Blangah in Singapore, the Johor government never had its own building. Before the current railway station was built, there was Johor Bahru railway station (formerly Wooden Railway) which has now been turned into a museum after serving for 100 years since the British colonial era.

Sultan Abu Bakar State Mosque, located along Skudai Road, is the main and the oldest mosque in the state. It was built with a combination of Victorian, Moorish and Malay architectures. The Johor Bahru Old Chinese Temple, located on the Trus Road, dedicated to the Five Patron Deities from the five Southern Chinese Clans (Hokkien, Teochew, Hakka, Cantonese & Hainanese) in the city. It was built in 1875 and renovated by the Persekutuan Tiong Hua Johor Bahru (Johor Bahru Tiong Hua Association) in 1994–95 with the addition of a small L-shaped museum in one corner of the square premises. The Wong Ah Fook Mansion, the home of the late Wong Ah Fook, was a former historical attraction. It stood for more than 150 years but was demolished illegally by its owner in 2014 to make way for a commercial housing development without informing the state government. Other historical religious buildings include the Arulmigu Sri Rajakaliamman Hindu Temple, Sri Raja Mariamman Hindu Temple, Gurdwara Sahib and Church of the Immaculate Conception.

Leisure and conservation areas

The Danga Bay is a  area of recreational waterfront. There are around 15 established golf courses, of which two offer 36-hole facilities; most of these are located within resorts. The city also features several paintball parks which are also used for off-road motorsports activities.

The Johor Zoo is one of the oldest zoos in Malaysia; built in 1928 covering  of land, it was originally called "animal garden" before being handed to the state government for renovation in 1962. The zoo has around 100 species of animals, including wild cats, camels, gorillas, orangutans, and tropical birds. Visitors can participate in activities such as horse riding or using pedalos. The largest park in the city is Independence Park.

Other attractions

Dataran Bandaraya was built after Johor Bahru was proclaimed as a city. The site features a clock tower, fountain and a large field. The Wong Ah Fook Street is named after Wong Ah Fook. The Tam Hiok Nee Street is named after Tan Hiok Nee, who was the leader of the former Ngee Heng Kongsi, a secret society in Johor Bahru. Together with the Dhoby Street, both are part of a trail known as Old Buildings Road; they feature a mixture of Chinese and Indian heritages, reflected by their forms of ethnic business and architecture.

Shopping

Shopping malls in Johor Bahru include Komtar JBCC, KSL City, Johor Bahru City Square, R&F Mall, Holiday Plaza, Paradigm Mall Johor Bahru, The Mall Mid Valley Southkey, Toppen Shopping Centre, Plaza Pelangi, Galleria@Kotaraya, AEON Tebrau City, Paragon Market Place, AEON Permas Jaya, Pelangi Leisure Mall, AEON Mall Bandar Dato' Onn, Plaza Sentosa, Stellar Walk and Beletime Danga Bay. The Mawar Handicrafts Centre, a government-funded exhibition and sales centre, is located along the Sungai Chat road and sells various batik and songket clothes. Opposite this is the Johor Area Rehabilitation Organisation (JARO) Handicrafts Centre which sells items such as hand-made cane furniture, soft toys and rattan baskets made by the physically disabled.

Entertainment

The oldest cinema in the city is the Broadway Theatre which mostly screens Tamil and Hindi movies. There are around other five cinemas available in the city with all of them located inside shopping malls.

Sports

The city's main association football club is a Johor Darul Ta'zim F.C. Its home stadium is Sultan Ibrahim Stadium has a capacity of around 40,000. There is also a futsal centre, known as Sports Prima, which has eight minimum-sized FIFA approved futsal courts; it is the largest indoor sports centre in the city.

Radio stations
Two radio stations have their offices in the city: Best FM (104.1) and Johor FM (101.9).

Crime 

For several decades running, Johor Bahru is notorious for its relatively high crime rate, compared to other urban areas in Malaysia. In 2014, Johor Bahru South police district recorded one of the highest crime rates in the country with 4,151 cases, behind Petaling Jaya. In 2013, the city also accounted for 70% of crimes committed in the entire state of Johor, with a Johor police spokesman admitting that Johor Bahru remained a crime hotspot within the state. Crime in Johor Bahru has also received substantial media coverage by the Singaporean press, as Singaporeans visiting or transiting through the neighbouring city are often targeted by criminals.

Among the more common criminal cases in Johor Bahru are robberies, snatch theft, carjacking, kidnapping and rape. Gang and unarmed robberies accounted for about 76% of the city's criminal cases in 2013 alone. Illegal car cloning is also rampant in the city. In addition, Johor Bahru's reputation for sleaze still exists, with some areas in the city centre turning into red-light districts, despite prostitution being illegal in Malaysia.

International relations

Several countries have set up their consulates in Johor Bahru, including Indonesia and Singapore, while Japan has closed its consular office since 2014.

Twin towns – Sister cities
Johor Bahru currently has seven sister cities:

  Changzhou, Jiangsu, China.
  Shantou, Guangdong, China.
  Shenzhen, Guangdong, China.
  Kuching, Sarawak, Malaysia.
  Singapore.
  Cotabato City, Bangsamoro, Philippines.
  Istanbul, Turkey.

In popular culture

Movies
Punggok Rindukan Bulan (2008)

Notable people 

 Christina Jordan (born 1962), Malaysian-born British politician
 Vivien Yeo (born 1984), Malaysian actress based in Hong Kong
 Gin Lee (born 1987), Malaysian singer based in Hong Kong
 Ng Tze Yong (born 2000), national badminton player
 Ronny Chieng (born 1985), Malaysian comedian and actor based in United States
 Tunku Abdul Rahman Hassanal Jeffri (born 1993), racing driver and member of the Johor Royal Family

See also

 Johor Bahru landmarks
 Johor Bahru Central District

Notes

References

Further reading

External links

 Johor Bahru City Council

 
Populated coastal places in Malaysia
Populated places established in 1855
Populated places in Johor
Malaysia–Singapore border crossings
1855 establishments in Asia